Mohamed Adama 'Momo' Sarr - Abdallah (born 23 December 1983) is a Senegalese former professional footballer who played as a centre-back.

Career
Sarr's clubs include Treviso, AC Milan, Galatasaray, Ancona, Atalanta, Vittoria, Standard Liège, Hércules CF, Genk and OFI Crete.

Whilst at Milan Sarr scored once against FC BATE Borisov in a 4–0 UEFA Cup win in September 2001.

Sarr made his debut for the Senegal national football team in 2001. He was part of the preliminary Senegal squad for 2002 Africa Cup of Nations.

Honours
 Standard Liège
 Belgian First Division A: 2007–08, 2008–09
 Belgian Super Cup: 2008, 2009

References

External links
 Player profile – standardliege.be
 Player profile – vi.nl
 

Living people
1983 births
Association football central defenders
Senegalese footballers
Senegal international footballers
2008 Africa Cup of Nations players
Serie A players
Serie B players
Süper Lig players
La Liga players
Belgian Pro League players
Super League Greece players
Treviso F.B.C. 1993 players
A.C. Milan players
Galatasaray S.K. footballers
A.C. Ancona players
Atalanta B.C. players
F.C. Vittoria players
Standard Liège players
Hércules CF players
K.R.C. Genk players
OFI Crete F.C. players
Senegalese expatriate footballers
Expatriate footballers in Italy
Expatriate footballers in Turkey
Senegalese expatriate sportspeople in Italy
Expatriate footballers in Belgium
Senegalese expatriate sportspeople in Turkey
Expatriate footballers in Spain
Expatriate footballers in Greece